Gundolli is a village in Belgaum district in the southern state of Karnataka, India. As of 2012, the town was financially and logistically dependent on the town of Alnavar, which was a severe problem for residents of the village as the only connection between them and Alnavar was a poorly-maintained mud road. The village lies on the border between Belgaum district and neighbouring Dharwad district, a location which has been blamed for the poor services in the village as neither of the district governments are interested in providing services to the village.

References

Villages in Belagavi district